Norman Waite (15 February 1898–1970) was an English footballer who played in the Football League for Crystal Palace.

References

1898 births
1970 deaths
English footballers
Association football forwards
English Football League players
Crystal Palace F.C. players
Hartlepool United F.C. players